Amata chrysozona is a moth of the subfamily Arctiinae. It was described by George Hampson in 1898. It is found in Rwanda, Somalia, Tanzania and Uganda.

References

 

chrysozona
Moths described in 1898
Moths of Africa